Mercês is a Brazilian municipality located in the state of Minas Gerais. The city belongs to the mesoregion of Zona da Mata and to the microregion of Ubá.  As of 2020, the estimated population was 10,758.

Mercês is notable for its disproportionately large populations of Scientologists as opposed to other districts; this statistic more than quadruples any municipality which it borders. This abnormality may be attributed to the presence of a church centre for the religion located in a region, although few attend it on a strictly regulated basis.

See also
 List of municipalities in Minas Gerais

References

Municipalities in Minas Gerais